Fanny Davies (27 June 1861 - 1 September 1934) was a British pianist who was particularly admired in Beethoven, Schumann, Brahms, and the early schools, but was also a very early London performer of the works of Debussy and Scriabin. In England, she was regarded as the 'successor' of Arabella Goddard, though her style and technique differed from Goddard's considerably.

Davies was born in Guernsey. Her first public performances were in Birmingham at the age of six. She studied privately in Birmingham, then at Leipzig Conservatory under Carl Reinecke and Oscar Paul: she then studied under Clara Schumann at Frankfurt. Her concert career began with the Saturday and Monday Popular Concerts in 1885; with the Philharmonic concerts 1886; Berlin, 1887; Gewandhaus, Leipzig, 1888; Rome, 1889; Beethoven Festival at Bonn, 1893; Vienna Philharmonic, 1895; Milan, 1895 and 1904; Paris, 1902, 1904 and 1905; Netherlands, 1920 and 1921; Prague, 1920 and 1922; and Spain 1923. She was frequently engaged by the Royal Philharmonic Society, making her last appearance in its Society programme on 15 

November 1915 under the baton of Thomas Beecham in Mozart's G major Concerto, K. 453. She had appeared in a Mozart concerto at Beecham's London debut at the Bechstein (Wigmore) Hall on 5 June 1905.

Her work in the large concert works was admired by many for its lyrical projection, warmth and clarity of inner lines and musicianly authority. George Bernard Shaw was not a great admirer, and in 1891 described as a 'wild young woman'. In May 1892, after a performance of Beethoven's Choral Fantasia, he wrote: 'To those who cannot understand how anybody could touch a note of that melody without emotion, her willing, affable, slap-dash treatment of it was a wonder'. But a year later, at her Crystal Palace performance of the Chopin F minor concerto, he was warming to her, calling it 'the most successful feat of interpretation and execution I have ever heard her achieve'.

Her once-popular late 1920s recording of Schumann's Piano Concerto in A minor represents a direct tradition from the composer. Harold C. Schonberg observed, 'behind her neat, controlled, tasteful playing one can see the specter of Clara'. Yet, despite an old recorded sound, the performance is not without its fire and drama.

Fanny Davies was also admired in chamber music, playing often in trio with Joseph Joachim. In 1892 (28 March, 2–4 April), she appeared with Richard Mühlfeld and Alfredo Piatti in the first London performances of the Brahms Clarinet Trio in A minor, Op. 114, when the Joachim Quartet with Mühlfeld was also performing the Clarinet Quintet in B minor, Op. 115. She also gave the first London performance of Brahms's D minor Violin Sonata, also with Joachim.  In her accompaniment of Joachim in the Brahms Hungarian Dances (April 1892), Shaw referred to her 'curious tricks and manners which so often suggest wicket-keeping rather than piano-playing.' She was accompanist for lieder recitals given in 1894–6 by the baritone David Bispham, in Schumann and Brahms (including the Op. 112 Liebeslieder); and in Brahms lieder for Gervase Elwes and Marie Brema on their German tour in 1908.

Like Leonard Borwick (another Clara Schumann pupil and accompanist in lieder to Harry Plunket Greene), she 'embodied in a remarkable degree the unique qualities of the romantic school of which ... Clara Schumann was admittedly the most spontaneous and finished exponent. The success of these two native artists was destined to afford great encouragement to rising students both in England and on the continent. It also helped to create among the general mass of amateurs a taste for pianoforte playing of a more warm-blooded type than had hitherto satisfied them', wrote Herman Klein in c. 1891. Davies also published musicological articles (e.g. on Schumann's music, Musical Times August 1911, and on Brahms's own playing and tempi in the C minor Piano Trio, Op. 101, in Cobbett's Cyclopedic Survey of Chamber Music) and gave musical lectures. An article about her appeared in the Musical Times for June 1905.

Fanny Davies was the first person to give a piano recital in Westminster Abbey.  She also gave the first public performance of Edward Elgar's Concert Allegro, Op. 46, in 1901. The piece was written only after constant requests from her for a new piece, and was dedicated to her.  Her performance, however, attracted rather negative reviews,

and it may have even been what caused Elgar to revise the work, a revision he never finished (the score was lost from around 1906 until 1968).

Davies died, aged 73, in London, England.

Recordings 
Schumann: Kinderscenen. Columbia Records C-L2321/2, 2×12" records, 4 sides.
Schumann: Davidsbündlertänze, Op. 6, omitting nos 3, 7, 15 and 16. Columbia Records C-67797/9D (Alb CM-142), 3×12" records, 6 sides.
Schumann: Concerto for piano and orchestra in A minor, Op 54. with Royal Philharmonic Orchestra under Ernest Ansermet. Columbia Records, C-67580/3 (in Alb CM-114) or C-9616/9, in Darrell but deleted c. 1936.
 On 28 March 1909 Fanny Davies recorded 14 piano rolls in London for Welte-Mignon.

Sources 

D. Bispham, A Quaker Singer's Recollections (New York 1920).
R.D. Darrell, The Gramophone Shop Encyclopedia of Recorded Music (New York 1936).
A. Eaglefield-Hull, A Dictionary of Modern Music and Musicians (Dent, London 1924).
W. Elwes & R Elwes, Gervase Elwes (London 1935).
W. Murdoch, Brahms (Rich and Cowan, London 1933).
H.C. Schonberg, The Great Pianists (London 1964).
G.B. Shaw, Music in London 1890–1894 (London 1932).

1861 births
1934 deaths

English classical pianists
English women pianists
Women classical pianists
Guernsey women
19th-century English musicians
19th-century classical pianists
20th-century English musicians
20th-century classical pianists
University of Music and Theatre Leipzig alumni
20th-century English women musicians
19th-century British women musicians
19th-century English women
19th-century women pianists
20th-century women pianists